Paraujano is an Arawakan language spoken by the Paraujano, or Anũ, people of Venezuela. The Paraujano live by Lake Maracaibo, Zulia State, in Northwest Venezuela.

General Information
The Paraujanos call themselves the Anu͂ or Anu͂n (means ‘human being), which is a self-denomination of the people. 'Paraujano' is better known in ethnographic literature. They received the name Paraujano from the neighboring Guajiros. The combination of palaa, meaning ‘sea’, and anu͂ literally means ‘people of the sea’, or fishermen. The Paraujano live in palafittes and are skilled at fishing and boating. According to a 2011 census, more than 21,000 people identify as Paraujano.

Classification
Paraujano is a Northern Arawakan, or Maipuran, language. It is derived from Gaujiro, yet is a distinct language and not a dialect of Gaujiro. The two languages are closely related. According to lexicostatistical analysis conducted by Oliver (1989) the two languages must have diverged around A.D. 900.

Status and Speakers
Paraujano is critically endangered and nearly extinct. The Maracaibo region began transforming into a largely populated industrial center in the early 1900s, as petroleum was extracted from the Maracaibo Lake. As the Paraujano mingled with others early on, their language was spread and spoken by some newcomers. However, by the 1970s there were only thirteen speakers remaining. As of 2014, there is one surviving fluent speaker, a thirty-year-old by the name of Yofri Márquez, who learned the language from his grandmother. There are a few partial speakers, most of whom are elderly. Revitalization efforts include Paraujano instruction in six regional elementary schools and the establishment of various cultural organizations.

Lexicon
Paraujano has incorporated some Spanish words into its vocabulary. Out the eighty-nine available words from the Swadesh list, six are Spanish substitutes.

Phonology
The Paraujano phoneme contains 14 pulmonic consonants and 11 vowels.

 The Paraujano phoneme differs from closely related Guajiro, mainly in vowels and due to the incorporation of Spanish lexicon. There are a number of allophones in Paraujano. Among these allophones, there is a tendency toward palatization or nasalization.

See also
Maracaibo Basin

Wayuu people

References

Further reading
Taylor, D. (1960). On Consonantal Correspondences in Three Arawakan Languages. International Journal of American Linguistics, 26(3), 244-252. 

Taylor, D. (1957). A Note on some Arawakan Words for Man, etc. International Journal of American Linguistics, 23(1), 46-48. 

VENEZUELA: Maracuchos: People of the Maracaibo Lowlands. (1999). Peoples of the Americas, (10), 570-572. 

Wilbert, J. (1996). Paraujano. In Encyclopedia of World Cultures. (Vol. 7, pp. 267–268). Macmillan Reference USA.

External links
 http://www.endangeredlanguages.com/lang/1573
 https://www.youtube.com/watch?v=J5T5AIDN0f0
 

Arawakan languages
Languages of Venezuela
Endangered indigenous languages of the Americas